The 1945–46 Holy Cross Crusaders men's basketball team represented The College of the Holy Cross during the 1944–45 NCAA men's basketball season. The head coach was Alvin Julian, coaching the crusaders in his first season. The team finished with an overall record of 12–3.

Schedule

|-

References

Holy Cross Crusaders men's basketball seasons
Holy Cross